Apparentment is the name given to the system, sometimes provided for in elections conducted according to the party-list proportional representation system, which allows parties to specify electoral alliances. The system has been used in Switzerland since 1919 and is now used in Israel.

Under list proportional representation, seats are awarded for each quota of votes obtained. Any votes excess to the quota are lost. Under apparentment, parties combine their vote excess, which may yield an additional full quota and candidate elected. For example, if there are 100 seats in the legislature, the quota per seat will be around 1%. If two parties poll 1.4 and 1.3 quotas respectively, they will probably only win one seat each if their votes are counted separately (assuming there is no further threshold, such as Germany's 5% barrier) but if they can combine their votes, they will have 2.7 quotas in total and a good chance of winning 3 seats overall. Usually the third seat would go to the party with 1.4% as it has more votes within the alliance.

There are two possible types of apparentment: different parties within a single electoral district combining their results, or the same party competing in different electoral districts combining these results.

The system introduces an element of ordinality. It is akin to a prespecified ranking in a preferential voting system like alternative vote or single transferable vote, as is used with the above-the-line system in Australian elections.

See also
 Electoral alliance
 Electoral fusion
 Party-list proportional representation

References

Proportional representation electoral systems